Golden Boy is an American crime drama television series created by Nicholas Wootton, which is produced by Berlanti Productions, Nicholas Wootton Productions, and Warner Bros. Television. CBS placed a series order on May 13, 2012. The series was originally broadcast on CBS from February 26 to May 14, 2013, airing Tuesdays at 10:00 pm ET.

On May 10, 2013, CBS canceled the series after one season.

Premise
The series follows the meteoric rise — from age 27 to 34 — of Walter Clark, an ambitious cop who becomes the youngest Police Commissioner in New York City history.

Cast and characters
 Theo James as Walter William Clark Jr., who in the first episode is a newly promoted homicide detective. Flashforwards reveal that in seven years, he will be the youngest police commissioner in the history of the department ("Pilot"). In the future, he walks with a pronounced limp ("The Price of Revenge").
 Chi McBride as Don Owen, Clark's partner, who is two years from retirement.
 Kevin Alejandro as homicide detective Christian Arroyo, a senior detective. Owen and Arroyo have a frosty relationship after a mistake by Arroyo that resulted in an informant's death. According to flashforwards in the premiere episode, their relationship will degenerate over time; they also suggest that Arroyo's hostility to Clark's arrival will result in at least one death ("The Price of Revenge"). He has a son who will follow in his footsteps as a police officer ("Young Guns").
 Bonnie Somerville as homicide detective Deb McKenzie, Arroyo's partner and illicit lover. She had a brother, now deceased, who was also a cop ("The Price of Revenge").
 Holt McCallany as homicide detective Joe Diaco.
 Stella Maeve as Agnes Clark, Walter's younger sister. She moves in with Walter during the pilot, and works at a diner near the police department.
 Ron Yuan as Lt. Peter Kang, the head of the homicide squad.

Home media
The Warner Archive released Golden Boy – The Complete Series on DVD on August 5, 2014.

Episodes

Reception
Reception for Golden Boy has typically been positive. On Metacritic, the series received "generally favorable reviews", reflected by a Metascore of 63 out of 100, based on 23 reviews. The Wall Street Journals Dorothy Rabinowitz stated the series "is packed with fine performances, but no amount of actorly talent could have done for this series what its intelligently twisty plots, its nuanced dialogue bearing a distinct resemblance to human exchange—even from the mouths of TV police detectives—has done." Alan Sepinwall of HitFix called the series "a solid, meat-and-potatoes police procedural, and one that could potentially evolve into more depending on how the flash-forwards are used down the road."  Newsdays Verne Gay called it a "decent cop procedural. Period." He added: "The best stuff in Golden Boy is the little stuff—sharp, brittle dialogue, nice performances and a street cred that's a cut above average." David Hinckley of the New York Daily News stated "We quickly care what happens to these characters, which gets any show off to a strong start. Just as quickly, though, the time-jumping makes the story feel more complicated than it needs to. Golden Boy doesn't need to be framed as a series of implicit or explicit flashbacks to engage us as an adventure tale." The New York Times Mike Hale stated the series "is a smoothly made but entirely generic show that rides the squad-room-as-family metaphor hard."

References

External links

2013 American television series debuts
2013 American television series endings
2010s American crime drama television series
2010s American police procedural television series
CBS original programming
English-language television shows
Fictional portrayals of the New York City Police Department
Nonlinear narrative television series
Television series by Warner Bros. Television Studios
Television shows set in New York City
Television shows filmed in New York (state)